Leptopelis fiziensis, also known as the Mokanga forest tree frog or Fizi tree frog , is a species of frog in the family Arthroleptidae. It is known from the Democratic Republic of the Congo and Tanzania, on both sides of Lake Tanganyika, and it is likely to occur in Burundi, in between the two know areas of distribution.

Distribution and taxonomy
Leptopelis fiziensis was first described as a subspecies of Leptopelis modestus, based on specimens from the Fizi Territory in the eastern Democratic Republic of the Congo. Later on it has also been recorded in western Tanzania. However, recent molecular work suggests that its closest relative is Leptopelis karissimbensis rather than Leptopelis modestus. Moreover, some of the Tanzanian records might refer to another species.

Description
Adult males measure  and females, based on a single specimen,  in snout–vent length. The tympanum is small. Digital discs are large. The dorsum is red-brown to brown, with darker patterning and tiny light specks. The ventrum is greyish while the femurs are reddish. The iris is golden. Males have a greyish throat.

The male advertisement call is a series of two or three clacks/pulses sounding like "quack-quack".

Habitat and conservation
Leptopelis fiziensis have been found in transitional forest in the forest-savanna mosaic, near a stream at the edge of montane forest, and dense
low bush at the edge of a clearing in dry forest. There is also a record from riverine forest within pristine miombo woodland, but this might refer to another species.

Threats to this species are unknown. It occurs in the Gombe Stream National Park, Tanzania.

References

fiziensis
Frogs of Africa
Amphibians of the Democratic Republic of the Congo
Amphibians of Tanzania
Amphibians described in 1973
Taxa named by Raymond Laurent
Taxonomy articles created by Polbot